Calceolaria obtusa is an endangered species of plant in the Calceolariaceae family, the main obstacle for gene flow of this genre is ecogeographic isolation. originated from the southern Andes mountains located in Chile. This flowering plant is also one of the largest oil-producing plants.

References

Endemic flora of Ecuador
obtusa
Endangered plants
Taxonomy articles created by Polbot

Cosacov, Andrea, et al. “New Insights into the Phylogenetic Relationships, Character Evolution, and Phytogeographic Patterns Ofcalceolaria(Calceolariaceae).” American Journal of Botany, vol. 96, no. 12, 2009, pp. 2240–2255., https://doi.org/10.3732/ajb.0900165.